The 1991 Clásica de San Sebastián was the 11th edition of the Clásica de San Sebastián cycle race and was held on 10 August 1991. The race started and finished in San Sebastián. The race was won by Gianni Bugno of the Chateau d'Ax team.

General classification

References

1991
1991 in Spanish road cycling
August 1991 sports events in Europe
1991 UCI Road World Cup